Eurabia is a political neologism, a portmanteau of Europe and Arabia, used to describe a far-right, anti-Muslim conspiracy theory, involving globalist entities which are allegedly led by French and Arab powers, to Islamize and Arabize Europe, thereby weakening its existing culture and undermining its previous alliances with the United States and Israel.

The term was first used in the 1970s as the title of a newsletter and the concept itself was developed by Bat Ye'or (the pen name of Gisèle Littman) in the early 2000s and it is described in her 2005 book titled Eurabia: The Euro‐Arab Axis.  Benjamin Lee of the  Centre for Research and Evidence on Security Threats at the University of Lancaster describes her work as arguing that Europe  "has surrendered to Islam and is in a state of submission (described as dhimmitude) in which Europe is forced to deny its own culture, stand silently by in the face of Muslim atrocities, accept Muslim immigration, and pay tribute through various types of economic assistance." According to the theory, the blame rests with a range of groups including communists, fascists, the media, universities, mosques and Islamic cultural centres, European bureaucrats, and the Euro-Arab Dialogue.

The term has gained some public interest and it has also been used and discussed by activists across a wide range of the political spectrum, including right-wing activists, self-described "conservatives" and counter-jihad and other anti-Islamism activists. Bat Ye'or's "mother conspiracy theory" has been used as the basis for other subtheories. The narrative grew important among people who expressed anti-Islamist sentiments and it was also used by members and supporters of movements like Stop Islamisation of Europe. It gained renewed interest after the September 11 attacks and the use of the term by 2011 Norway attacker, Anders Behring Breivik. Ye'or's thesis has come under criticism by scholars, which intensified after Breivik's crime. The conspiracy has been described as having a resemblance to the anti-Semitic Protocols of the Elders of Zion.

Eurabia has also been discussed by believers in classical anti-Europeanism, a strong influence on the culture of the United States as well as by believers in the notion of American exceptionalism, which sometimes sees Europe on the decline or as a rising rival power, or, as is the case here, both.

Basic narrative 
In Eurabia: The Euro-Arab Axis, Bat Ye'or says that Eurabia is the result of the Euro-Arab Dialogue, based on an allegedly French-led European policy intended to increase European power against the United States by aligning its interests with those of the Arab countries. During the 1973 oil crisis, the European Economic Community (predecessor of the European Union), had entered into the Euro-Arab Dialogue (EAD) with the Arab League. Ye'or says it as a primary cause of alleged European hostility to Israel, referring to joint Euro-Arab foreign policies that she characterises as anti-American and anti-Zionist. Ye'or purported a close connection of a Eurabia conspiracy and used the term "dhimmitude", denoting alleged "western subjection to Islam". The term itself is based on a newsletter published in the 1970s by the Comité européen de coordination des associations d'amitié avec le monde Arabe, a Euro-Arab friendship committee.

Bat Ye'or's Eurabia: The Euro-Arab Axis was the first print publication in the Eurabia genre, which has since grown to a number of titles, including Melanie Phillips's Londonistan, Oriana Fallaci's The Force of Reason, and Bruce Bawer's While Europe Slept.
The term is often used by the writers Oriana Fallaci, Mark Steyn and several web sites, many of them affiliated with the counterjihad movement. Defeating Eurabia by Fjordman (the pen name of Peder Are Nøstvold Jensen) earned him a high standing among far-right extremists.

An important part of the narrative is the idea of a demographic threat, the fear that, at some time in the future, Islam will take over Europe. or as Bernard Lewis put it, "Europe will be Islamic by the end of the century." Walter Laqueur's The Last Days of Europe: Epitaph for An Old Continent is quoted often among the Eurabia literature.

Impact

Post-1945 
While immigrants were being deemed a threat, in the postwar 1940s period, the British extreme right in particular, fascist politician Oswald Mosley were rather outspoken (see the Union Movement and the Europe a Nation slogan) in favour of a stronger integration of Britain with Europe and, using their own interpretation of the Eurafrica concept, Africa.

Post-9/11 significance 

Bat Ye'or first used the term "Eurabia" in 2002 and again in another 2005 book. Subsequently, the coining of the term has been attributed to her. The conservative historian Niall Ferguson referred to the concept, which he took as the potential future Islamisation of Europe based on demographic facts and ideational lack of the continent.

2010s Europe 
The idea of a Eurabian conspiracy has become a basic theme in the European extremist and populist right and expresses as well a significant strategy change. José Pedro Zúquete notes that

Muslim minority populations and Muslim immigration gained new political significance. This has led to the adoption of political positions that were previously considered fringe or third rail on either side. The main anti-Islamic theme has also penetrated into mainstream European politics, for instance in the case of Dutch populist Party for Freedom leader Geert Wilders:

Issues 
 
The Eurabia concept is an Islamophobic conspiracy theory. Eurabia shortcuts the complex interaction between the US, France, Israel, the Arabic and Muslim countries on an "us against them" basis. The Eurabia theories are dismissed as Islamophobic, extremist and conspiracy theories in the academic community. At first academics showed little interest in the Eurabia theories due to their lack of factual basis. The theme was treated in studies of rightist extremism and Middle East Politics. This changed after the 2011 Norway attacks, which resulted in the publication of several works specifically treating the Eurabia conspiracy theories.
Janne Haaland Matláry went as far as to say that "it is poor use of time to analyse something so primitive".

Demography 
The Pew Research Center said in 2011 that "the data that we have isn't pointing in the direction of 'Eurabia' at all", and predicts that the percentage of Muslims is estimated to rise to 8% in 2030. In 2007 academics who analysed the demographics dismissed the predictions that the EU would have Muslim majorities.
It is completely reasonable to assume that the overall Muslim population in Europe will increase, and Muslim citizens have and will have a significant imprint on European life. The prospect of a homogeneous Muslim community per se, or a Muslim majority in Europe is however out of the question.

Justin Vaïsse seeks to discredit what he calls, "four myths of the alarmist school", using Muslims in France as an example. Specifically he has written that the Muslim population growth rate was lower than that predicted by Eurabia, partly because the fertility rate of immigrants declines with integration. He further points out that Muslims are not a monolithic or cohesive group, and that many Muslims do seek to integrate politically and socially. Finally, he wrote that despite their numbers, Muslims have had little influence on French foreign policy.

Furthermore, leading European Muslims are rather outspoken against religious fundamentalism and are far from acknowledging Arab countries as a role model at all.

Spread of conspiracies and further influences 
Examples of proponents use:

Europe

Germany 

In 2010, German politician Thilo Sarrazin released Germany Abolishes Itself. The book contends that with continued Islamic immigration, Germany will become a majority Muslim nation. Journalist Simon Kuper has argued that, with over 1 million copies sold, Sarrazin had done more to publicize the concept of Eurabia more than anybody else in Europe.

In political campaigning for the 2019 European Parliament election, Germany's far-right party AfD used Jean-Léon Gérôme's 1886 painting The Slave Market with the slogan "Europeans vote AfD!" and "So Europe doesn't become Eurabia!". Deutsche Welle reported that the reproduction of the painting suggestively depicted dark-skinned men with beards and foreign-dress "inspecting the teeth of a nude white woman".

Italy 
In 2004, journalist Oriana Fallaci claimed that Muslim immigration and high fertility was part of the conspiracy theory. In 2005, Fallaci told The Wall Street Journal that "Europe is no longer Europe", adding "it is 'Eurabia,' a colony of Islam".

In 2011, Francesco Speroni, a sitting MEP for Lega Nord, stated that he shared the same view as Anders Behring Breivik's idea "that we are going towards Eurabia". In the aftermath of the shooting, Speroni confirmed his agreement with Breivik on the conspiracy theory in an interview with Radio 24.

In 2018, Giulio Meotti used the theory in relation to the demographics of Europe, writing that "Europe is over. Its future will be a mix of Eurabia and a geriatric ward."

In May 2019, ahead of the European elections, Lega Nord leader for Sarzana claimed that both the European People's Party and the Party of European Socialists were attempting to bring about Eurabia. The day before the vote, Italian Deputy Prime Minister Matteo Salvini endorsed the theory as a genuine threat. He insisted that a state of Eurabia had already occurred in Sweden, a claim which the Swedish embassy promptly denied with an official statement. Invoking the memory of Oriana Fallaci, he released an anti-migrant speech on Twitter, accompanied by the message "No to Eurabia".

Netherlands 
In 2008, journalist Arthur van Amerongen described Molenbeek as "Brussels: Eurabia". Despite alleging that writer Wim van Rooy had already coined the phrase, Amerongen faced severe peer and media criticism for endorsing the conspiracy theory. After the November 2015 Paris attacks and discovery of a Brussels ISIL terror cell, photojournalist Teun Voeten agreed with Amerongen's description, calling the municipality an "ethnic and religious enclave".

Party for Freedom leader Geert Wilders, who serves in the Dutch House of Representatives, has openly stated that "if we do not stop Islamification now, Eurabia and Netherabia will just be a matter of time." A supporter of the conspiracy theory, Wilders believes Muslim immigration to Europe is being driven by an agreement between the European Union and Islamic countries. He has delivered speeches in the Dutch parliament about Eurabia.

Norway 
In 2008, Peder Are Nøstvold Jensen, writing under his pseudonym Fjordman, published Defeating Eurabia. The book contends that 1 in 3 babies born in France are from a Muslim-background, and that there are hundreds of "Muslim ghettos" following Sharia law in the country, which Fjordman believes will either be overrun or face an impending civil war.

2083: A European Declaration of Independence, the manifesto of Anders Behring Breivik, the perpetrator of the 2011 Norway attacks, includes a lengthy discussion of and support for the "Eurabia" theory. It also contains several articles on the Eurabia theme by Bat Ye'or and Fjordman. As a result, the theory received widespread mainstream media attention following the attacks. In the verdict against Breivik, the court said that "many people share Breivik's conspiracy theory, including the Eurabia theory. The court finds that very few people, however, share Breivik's idea that the alleged "Islamization" should be fought with terror."

Breivik has later stated that he previously had exploited "counterjihad" rhetoric in order to protect "ethno-nationalists", thereby instead launching a media drive against what he deemed "anti-nationalist counterjihad"-supporters.

United Kingdom 
 
  The premises common to these theories are that a rapid demographic transition in Europe has been induced by "European politicians and civil servants", and will lead to a Muslim majority which will have an unchanging, hostile attitude toward their host nations. Other premises, such as acquiring the compliance of or control over bureaucracies, intelligentsias and European political leaders are frequent.

North America

Canada 
Author Mark Steyn, described as a "champion of 'Eurabia' myth" by Canadian newspaper The Globe and Mail, has predicted an emerging Eurabia region, captured by the religion of Islam and hostile to U.S. interests. Steyn's promotion of the conspiracy theory centres on European demographics, where he believes a culturally asserted Muslim mass will become the majority population and demand the assimilation of white Europeans.

United States 

In the United States, the theories have found strong proponents in the Islamophobia movement, among them the president of Stop Islamization of America, Robert B. Spencer and political commentator Daniel Pipes.

In May 2006, Fox News host John Gibson called for white Americans to have more babies, referencing a decline in the "native population" of Europe as an apparent demographic warning for the U.S. regarding Hispanic birthrates. In what Media Matters reported as fearmongering, he claimed that Eurabia was occurring in Europe.

In his 2011–2012 run for the Republican presidential nomination, senator Rick Santorum warned that Europe was "creating an opportunity for the creation of Eurabia", and that the continent was "losing, because they are not having children." Classicist Bruce Thornton is also a strong advocate for the theory.

A 2007 film outline by Steve Bannon, who would later become the chief strategist for President Donald Trump and a member of the U.S. National Security Council, proposed that Muslims were trying to turn the United States into the "Islamic States of America".

Criticism
The Economist rejected the concept of Eurabia as "scaremongering". Simon Kuper in the Financial Times described Ye'or's book as "little-read but influential", and akin to "Protocols of the Elders of Zion in reverse", adding that "though ludicrous, Eurabia became the spiritual mother of a genre".

David Aaronovitch acknowledges that the threat of "jihadist terror" may be real, but that there is no threat of Eurabia. Aaronovitch concludes that those who study conspiracy theories will recognize Eurabia to be a theory that adds the "Sad Dupes thesis to the Enemy Within idea".

Conservative US military analyst Ralph Peters has criticized the Eurabia narrative on the grounds that it is unlikely to happen as posited, citing the historical precedent of genocides frequently occurring in Europe, such as in the Balkans during the 1990s, and the Holocaust during World War II. Peters stated that if Muslims "taking over" Europe were imminent, Europeans would either forcibly deport their Muslims at best or engage in a genocide of them at worst, possibly leading to a U.S. intervention on behalf of persecuted Muslims.

In his 2007 book Wars of Blood and Faith, Peters states that far from being about to take over Europe through demographic change, "Europe's Muslims are living on borrowed time" and that in the event of a major terrorist attack in Europe, thanks to the "ineradicable viciousness" of Europeans and what he perceives as a historical tendency to over-react to real or perceived threats, European Muslims "will be lucky if they're only deported".

According to Marján and Sapir, the very idea of "Eurabia" is "based on an extremist conspiracy theory, according to which Europe and the Arab states would join forces to make life impossible for Israel and Islamize the old continent."

Writing in Race & Class in 2006, author and freelance journalist Matt Carr argued that Eurabia had moved from "an outlandish conspiracy theory" to a "dangerous Islamophobic fantasy". Carr states,

Arun Kundnani, writing for the International Centre for Counter-terrorism, notes that "Eurabia" fulfills the counter-jihad movement's "structural need" for a conspiracy theory, and compares "Eurabia" to The Protocols of the Elders of Zion, while Carr compares it to the Zionist Occupation Government conspiracy theory.

Doug Saunders argues that pro-Al-Qaeda writers, and those who promote the Eurabia theory as truth, have a common extremism and world view, where "there is one creature called 'the Muslim' and another called 'the Westerner. He proposes that there is no such distinction and that Muslims can become secular in the Western world.

See also

 
 
 
 
 
  (influential in Putin's Russia)

Notes

External links

 
2000s neologisms
Arabization
Islamization
Euroscepticism
Islam-related controversies
Political neologisms
Demographics of Europe
Anti-Arabism in Europe
Neologisms
Political catchphrases
Scares
Conspiracy theories in Europe
Conspiracy theories involving Muslims
Far-right politics in Europe
Far-right politics in the United States
Islamophobia in Europe
White genocide conspiracy theory
Stereotypes of Arab people